Arsht is a surname. Notable people with the surname include:

Adrienne Arsht (born 1942), American businesswoman and philanthropist
 Arsht Center
Roxana Cannon Arsht (1915–2003), American judge